Richard Onslow, 1st Baron Onslow PC (23 June 1654 – 5 December 1717), known as Sir Richard Onslow, 2nd Baronet from 1688 until 1716, was a British Whig politician who sat in the English and British House of Commons from 1679 to 1715. He was Speaker of the House of Commons from 1708 to 1710 and Chancellor of the Exchequer from 1714 to 1715. Onslow was a very unpopular figure amongst members of both political parties, particularly during his time as Speaker. He was extremely pedantic and showed an absolute devotion to principle, as a result, he was given the nickname "Stiff Dick".

Onslow's father, Arthur, was a politician, as was his maternal grandfather Thomas Foote, who had served as the Lord Mayor of London in 1649. He was born in Surrey and matriculated at St Edmund Hall, Oxford on 7 June 1671, before being called to the Inner Temple. He entered Parliament as the Member for Guildford in 1679 before he could be called to the bar. One of Onslow's first actions as a member of Parliament was to support the Exclusion Bill, which aimed, unsuccessfully, to deny the Catholic James II of England the British throne. He was re-elected in 1685. He also served as a Lord of the Admiralty from 1690 to 1693.

Onslow was an active back-bencher during his early years in Parliament, and his increasing notoriety as a moderate Whig led to him being nominated for the position of Speaker in 1700 when the member for Surrey. He was unsuccessful in this bid, losing out to the Tory candidate, Robert Harley. However, Onslow managed to attain the position of Speaker seven years later, in 1708. He proved to be a poor Speaker as he made no effort whatsoever to show any kind of neutrality, a fact which upset all but the most fervent Whigs. Onslow's pedantry as Speaker also enhanced his unpopularity. The most famous incident during his Speakership came during the trial of the preacher Dr. Henry Sacheverell, in which Onslow played a large part. When Onslow took the Commons to the House of Lords to hear their judgment on the case he challenged Black Rod on a trifling point of privilege, delaying the proceedings somewhat, which infuriated almost everyone in attendance. Onslow's unpopularity by this point was such that he failed to retain his seat in the 1710 election. In order to remain in the Commons he was forced to sit instead for the rotten borough of St Mawes.

Onslow regained much of his political favour four years later, now restored as the member for Surrey. Upon the death of Queen Anne in 1714 Onslow was a vocal advocate of a Protestant successor, in return for his support Onslow was rewarded by being named as Chancellor of the Exchequer, a position he held for around a year before resigning. He became Father of the House in 1713, and was created Baron Onslow on 19 July 1716.

He served as Lord Lieutenant of Surrey from 1716 until his death the following year. He had married Elizabeth, the daughter and heiress of Sir Henry Tulse, Lord Mayor of London, with whom he had two sons and two daughters. He was succeeded by his son Thomas. His nephew Arthur Onslow later became a long-serving Speaker himself.

References

External links

1654 births
1717 deaths
People from Surrey
Alumni of St Edmund Hall, Oxford
1
Peers of Great Britain created by George I
Chancellors of the Exchequer of Great Britain
Lord-Lieutenants of Surrey
Lords of the Admiralty
Onslow, Richard, 2nd Baronet
Members of the Privy Council of Great Britain
Onslow, Richard, 2nd Baronet
Onslow, Richard, 2nd Baronet
Members of the Inner Temple
English MPs 1679
English MPs 1680–1681
English MPs 1681
English MPs 1685–1687
English MPs 1689–1690
English MPs 1690–1695
English MPs 1695–1698
English MPs 1698–1700
English MPs 1701
English MPs 1701–1702
English MPs 1702–1705
English MPs 1705–1707
British MPs 1707–1708
British MPs 1708–1710
British MPs 1710–1713
British MPs 1713–1715
British MPs 1715–1722
Richard Onslow, 1st Baron